Sethu Institute of Technology was started in 1995 by the Sethu Educational Trust, established by Thiru.S.Mohamed Jaleel. The college is approved by the All India Council for Technical Education, New Delhi, Accreditation by National Board of Accreditation, New Delhi  and is affiliated to Anna University, Chennai. It offers Bachelors programmes in Thirteen UG disciplines and Five PG programmes. The  college is awarded autonomous status in the year 2012 by UGC and it was confirmed by Anna University, Chennai in 2012.

Courses Offered
Under Graduate Courses:
    
 B.E. Mechanical Engineering×
 B.E. Computer Science and Engineering*
 B.E. Electronics and Communication Engineering*
 B.E. Electrical and Electronics Engineering*
 B.Tech Information Technology×
 B.E. Civil Engineering
 B.E. Agriculture Engineering 
 B.E. Biomedical Engineering 
 B.Tech. Biotechnology
 B.Tech. Computer Science and Business Systems
 B.E. Computer Science and Design
 B.Tech Artificial Intelligence and Data Science
 B.E. Computer Science and Engineering (Artificial Intelligence and Machine Learning)

Post Graduate Courses:
 
 M.E. CAD/CAM
 M.E. Communication System
 M.E. Computer Science and Engineering
 M.E. Power Electronics and Drives
 M.E. Structural Engineering

Research and development
The following departments are approved as recognised Research Centre by Anna University, Chennai
 Department of Electrical and Electronics Engineering
 Department of Mechanical Engineering
 Department of Electronics and Communication Engineering
 Department of Computer Science and Engineering 
 Department of Physics
 Department of Chemistry

Colleges affiliated to Anna University
Education in Virudhunagar district
Educational institutions established in 1995
1995 establishments in Tamil Nadu